Almond is one of the 17 wards of the City of Edinburgh Council. Established in 2007 along with the other wards, it currently elects four councillors.

The River Almond flows through much of its territory, which covers the north-western edge of the city – Barnton, Cammo, Cramond, Davidson's Mains, Muirhouse (a 2017 boundary change addition which increased the population and consequently the number of councillors) and Silverknowes – and outlying communities at Dalmeny, Kirkliston, Newbridge and South Queensferry, adjoining West Lothian and the natural boundary of the Firth of Forth. In 2019, the ward had a population of 36,730.

Councillors

Election results

2022 election
2022 City of Edinburgh Council election

2017 election
2017 City of Edinburgh Council election

2012 election
2012 City of Edinburgh Council election
       
   
   
  
                                                      

               

Liberal Democrat Councillor Alastair Shields resigned from the party and became an Independent after having been de-selected, with the intention to contest the 2017 local elections as an Independent (ultimately he retired).

2007 election
2007 City of Edinburgh Council election

References

External links
Listed Buildings in Almond Ward, City of Edinburgh at British Listed Buildings

Wards of Edinburgh